Van Bibber is a surname. Notable people with the surname include:

George Van Bibber (1909–1982), American football player, coach, and professor
Geraldine Van Bibber (born 1951), Canadian politician

See also
Van Bebber

Surnames of Dutch origin